Erik Jensen (born 4 June 1962) is a Danish hurdler. He competed in the men's 110 metres hurdles at the 1988 Summer Olympics.

References

1962 births
Living people
Athletes (track and field) at the 1988 Summer Olympics
Danish male hurdlers
Olympic athletes of Denmark
Place of birth missing (living people)